Kazachy is a rural locality (a khutor) in Zakharovskoye Rural Settlement, Kletsky District, Volgograd Oblast, Russia. The population was 202 as of 2010. There are 4 streets.

Geography 
Kazachy is located on the right bank of the Don River, 27 km southwest of Kletskaya (the district's administrative centre) by road. Zakharov is the nearest rural locality.

References 

Rural localities in Kletsky District